Albert De Raedt (22 July 1918 – 17 April 1992) was a Belgian footballer. He played in four matches for the Belgium national football team from 1939 to 1940.

References

External links
 

1918 births
1992 deaths
Belgian footballers
Belgium international footballers
Place of birth missing
Association football goalkeepers